The 1941 National Invitation Tournament was the 1941 edition of the annual NCAA college basketball competition.

Selected teams
Below is a list of the eight teams selected for the tournament.

 CCNY
 Duquesne
 Long Island
 Ohio
 Rhode Island
 Seton Hall
 Virginia
 Westminster

Bracket
Below is the tournament bracket.

See also
 1941 NCAA basketball tournament
 1941 NAIA Basketball Tournament

References

National Invitation
National Invitation Tournament
1940s in Manhattan
National Invitation Tournament
National Invitation Tournament
College sports tournaments in New York City
Basketball competitions in New York City
Sports in Manhattan